Edwin Olmstead Keeler (January 12, 1846 in Ridgefield – December 4, 1923) was an American banker and Republican Lieutenant Governor of Connecticut from 1901 to 1903.

He had previously served as the first mayor of Norwalk, Connecticut from 1893 to 1894. He was a member of the Connecticut House of Representatives from 1893 to 1896, and was a member of the Connecticut Senate representing the 12th District from 1897 to 1900. He served as President pro tempore of the Connecticut Senate. He served as a delegate to the Republican National Convention from Connecticut in 1896.

Early life and family 
He was the son of Jonah Charles Keeler (1808-1873) and Henrietta Olmstead. Prior to his political career, he was a banker. On May 13, 1868, he married Sarah Velina Whiting. He was of English ancestry, all of which has been in the country since the colonial period. His earliest ancestor in America was Ralph Keeler, one of the founding settlers of Norwalk, who came from England to Hartford, Connecticut in 1640.

References

1846 births
1923 deaths
American bankers
American grocers
Republican Party Connecticut state senators
Lieutenant Governors of Connecticut
Mayors of Norwalk, Connecticut
Republican Party members of the Connecticut House of Representatives
People from Ridgefield, Connecticut
Presidents pro tempore of the Connecticut Senate